Jaime Piris (born 17 February 1962) is a Spanish sailor. He competed in the Star event at the 1992 Summer Olympics.

References

External links
 

1962 births
Living people
Spanish male sailors (sport)
Olympic sailors of Spain
Sailors at the 1992 Summer Olympics – Star
Sportspeople from Barcelona